Pionerskaya rail station is a railway station located in St. Petersburg, Russia.

It was constructed by the joint-stock company of the Prinorskaya St.-Peterburg-Sestroretsk railway and was opened with the Ozerki line on July 23, 1893.

In 1948 it was re-opened as a part of the narrow-gauge Malaya October Railway under the name the Zoopark.  In 1969 it was renamed to Pionerskaya, and was closed in 1990.

References 

Railway stations in Saint Petersburg
Railway stations in the Russian Empire opened in 1893
Railway stations closed in 1990